Sukollawat Kanaros (born 18 April 1985), nicknamed Weir, is a Thai actor, model and singer. He is seen on Thai television Channel 7.

Early life and education
Weir was born on 18 April 1985, in Khon Kaen, Thailand. He is the second son of Veera and Ploypailin. He also had an older brother who died in 2009.

He graduated from kindergarten, primary and secondary school from the Demonstration School of Khon Kaen University (Mor Din Daeng). He went on to  earn a Bachelor's from the Department of Civil Engineering at Khon Kaen University and a Master's in entertainment media management from Kantana Institute.

Career
Weir entered the entertainment industry from a help of Supachai who later became his personal manager. Accidentally, Supachai saw Weir's photo on his acquaintance's cell phone and realized the commercial potential of Weir's look in the entertainment industry. Then, he decided to fly to Khon Kaen where Weir lived in order to persuade him to work in entertainment industry. At that time, Weir was still in his second year of university.

After gaining permission from his parents, Weir decided to enter the industry and later, became a successful and prominent actor. His first acting involvement was with the story Plik Din Su Dao. He was also involved in some theatrical works, such as Pleng Rak Rim Fah Khong (with the co-star Alexandra Thidawan Boonchuay). Besides involvement in movies and dramas, Weir is also a star on Channel 7 program of young mother.

Weir loves riding big motorbike and on his day off, he likes planting and taking care of the plants he bought in Nakhon Nayok.

Filmography

Films

Television series

Master of Ceremony: MC ON TV

Advertising

Awards and nominations

Notes

References

External links

 
 

1985 births
Living people
Sukollawat Kanaros
Sukollawat Kanaros
Sukollawat Kanaros
Sukollawat Kanaros
Sukollawat Kanaros
Sukollawat Kanaros
Sukollawat Kanaros
Thai television personalities
Sukollawat Kanaros
Sukollawat Kanaros